Fou is a concept album by the French progressive rock band Ange. It was released in 1984.

Track listing
Side One:
"Les Yeux D'un Fou"  – 03:55
"(Je N'suis) Là Pour Personne"  – 04:10
"Piège À Cœur"  – 03:59
"Harmonie"  – 03:44
"(Hé !) Cobaye"  – 03:33
Side Two:
"Les Fous Demandent Un Roi"  – 05:27
"Guignols"  – 03:28
"Guignols [La Chasse]"  – 02:07
"Fou"  – 04:12
"Crever D'amour [Prélude]"  – 02:40
"Crever D'amour [Coït Terminal]"  – 04:20

Personnel
 Lead Vocals, Pianos: Christian Decamps
 Keyboards, Backing Vocals: Francis Decamps
 Guitar: Serge Cuenot
 Bass: Laurent Sigrist
 Drums, Percussion: Jean-Claude Potin

Additional Musicians 
 Sequences: Fred Betin
 Drums Machines: Jean-Claude Potin
 Litter And Menus: Auberge des Santons

References
Fou on ange-updlm 
Fou on www.discogs.com

Ange albums
1984 albums